Sedgeford was a railway station which served the settlement of Sedgeford in Norfolk, England. Opened by the West Norfolk Junction Railway in 1866, passenger services ceased with the line in 1952.

History 
The construction of the West Norfolk Junction Railway was prompted by the success of the Lynn and Hunstanton Railway which had opened in 1862 to link King's Lynn with the seaside town of Hunstanton. The West Norfolk opened in 1866 at the start of a major financial crisis triggered by the collapse of Overend Gurney Bank; the year also saw the outbreak of a "cattle plague" in North Norfolk which impacted on the cattle receipts on the line. The West Norfolk was absorbed into the Lynn and Hunstanton Railway in 1872 which in turn was acquired by the Great Eastern Railway in 1890. The line eventually closed to passengers in 1952, a consequence of rising costs and falling passenger numbers, aggravated by the inconvenient siting of stations. Up to the end of its passenger services, the line was one of the last where one could travel in gas-lit clerestory coaches hauled by Victorian locomotives.

A freight service continued to operate until 1964, though it was cut back to Heacham/Burnham Market after the North Sea flood of 1953 which badly damaged the section between Holkham and Wells, damage which British Railways judged not worth repairing.

Sedgeford station was the first station after Heacham on the single-track West Norfolk Junction Railway. It was a small station located in a rural area, equipped with a single platform on the down side, built to smaller dimensions to other stations on the Lynn and Hunstanton Railway, and without a stationmaster's residence. Very basic goods facilities were provided in the shape of a single carriage siding on the down side. The station's staff amounted to two persons, reduced to one in the final years. Traffic on the line was largely agricultural, consisting of corn, sugar beet, cattle and agricultural machinery. A level crossing lay to the east of the platform.

Present day 
The station buildings have been particularly well preserved as a private residence, complete with the station sign and Great Eastern Railway notices. The level crossing gate remains with a notice reading "Failure to shut the gate - fine 40/-".

See also 
 List of closed railway stations in Norfolk
 Sedgeford station on navigable 1946 O. S. map

References

Disused railway stations in Norfolk
Former Great Eastern Railway stations
Railway stations in Great Britain opened in 1866
Railway stations in Great Britain closed in 1952
1866 establishments in England